Sergei Ivanovich Ivanov (born 22 March 1964) is a former Russian football player and referee.

External links
 

1964 births
Living people
Soviet footballers
FC SKA Rostov-on-Don players
FC Rostov players
FC APK Morozovsk players
Navbahor Namangan players
Russian footballers
Russian expatriate footballers
Expatriate footballers in Uzbekistan
FC Lada-Tolyatti players
Russian Premier League players
Russian football referees
Place of birth missing (living people)
Association football defenders
FC Taganrog players